Vishwak Sen  (born Dinesh Naidu; 29 March 1995) is an Indian actor, director, and screenwriter who works in Telugu films. He made his debut in 2017 with Vellipomakey and went on to appear in films such as Ee Nagaraniki Emaindhi , his first directorial Falaknuma Das,HIT: The First Case, Paagal, Ashoka Vanamlo Arjuna Kalyanam, Ori Devuda.

Early life
Vishwak Sen was born as Dinesh Naidu on 29 March 1995, in Hyderabad, Telangana. He changed his name to Vishwak Sen in adulthood, prior to entering the film industry, as per numerology on the suggestion of his father, who believed he would never achieve success with his birthname.

Career
Sen made his acting debut with Vellipomakey (2017). The film released to above average reviews and a reviewer from The Times of India stated that "Vishwak Sen does a good job at playing Chandu and is a natural". in 2018, he starred in Ee Nagaraniki Emaindhi directed by Tharun Bhascker Dhaassyam of Pelli Choopulu  fame. The film received positive reviews upon release and was a success at the box office. Sen made his directorial debut with Falaknuma Das (2019), a remake of Angamaly Diaries. The film released to mixed reviews, but the depiction of Old City, Hyderabad was praised. His next film was HIT: The First Case (2020) produced by actor Nani. HIT released to positive reviews from critics.  In 2021 he starred in Paagal alongside Nivetha pethuraj It got mixed reviews from critics and audience but got praise for Vishwak's performance , chemistry between Vishwak and Nivetha,Songs and Background score. In May 2022 he started in Ashoka Vanamlo Arjuna Kalyanam. It got mixed reviews from critics and audience with praise for performance of vishwak. In October 2022 he started in Ori Devuda along Mithila Palkar and Asha Bhat. It was a remake of tamil film Oh My Kaduvule. It received mixed reviews from critics and audience praising performances and story.

Filmography

References

External links

Telugu male actors
Male actors in Telugu cinema
Telugu film directors
Male actors from Hyderabad, India
Living people
Santosham Film Awards winners
1995 births
21st-century Indian male actors
Indian film directors
Film directors from Hyderabad, India
21st-century Indian film directors